Alkalihalobacillus marmarensis is a Gram-positive, aerobic and obligately alkaliphilic bacterium from the genus of Alkalihalobacillus which has been isolated from isolated from mushroom compost from Yalova.

References

Bacillaceae
Bacteria described in 2010